Carinetini is a tribe of cicadas in the family Cicadidae, found in the neotropics. There are about 7 genera and at least 90 described species in Carinetini.

Genera
These seven genera belong to the tribe Carinetini:
 Ahomana Distant, 1905 i c g
 Carineta Amyot & Audinet-Serville, 1843 i c g
 Guaranisaria Distant, 1905 i c g
 Herrera Distant, 1905 i c g
 Novemcella Goding, 1925 i c g
 Paranistria Metcalf, 1952 c g
 Toulgoetalna Boulard, 1982 i c g
Data sources: i = ITIS, c = Catalogue of Life, g = GBIF, b = Bugguide.net

References

Further reading

External links

 

 
Cicadettinae
Hemiptera tribes